Elmore is an unincorporated community in the town of Ashford, Fond du Lac County, Wisconsin, United States. Elmore was originally known as Leglerville for founder Ulrich Legler, who built a sawmill in the community in 1857. The community later took its current name to honor Andrew Elmore, who represented the area in the Wisconsin Assembly in 1859 and 1860.

Notes

Unincorporated communities in Fond du Lac County, Wisconsin
Unincorporated communities in Wisconsin